Captains Courageous is a 1977 American television film based on the novel Captains Courageous by Rudyard Kipling. It was produced by Norman Rosemont, who made a number of television films based on classic novels.

It was shot off the coast of Maine with a budget of $1.5 million.

Rosemont had to pay $25,000 to the Kipling estate. Although the work was in the public domain in the US it was still in copyright in other territories.

Cast
Karl Malden

References

External links

1977 television films
1977 films
ABC network original films
American adventure films
American television films
Sea adventure films
Films based on works by Rudyard Kipling
Films directed by Harvey Hart
1970s American films